Cue sports was contested at the Asian Games for the first time at the 1998 Asian Games in Bangkok, Thailand between 6 and 19 December 1998. The competition took place at the Land Sports Complex. The competition included only men's events.

There were ten events at the competition, Carom billiards, English billiards, Pool and Snooker.

Medalists

Medal table

Participating nations
A total of 123 athletes from 21 nations competed in cue sports at the 1998 Asian Games:

References

External links 
Asian Confederation of Billiards Sports

 
1998 Asian Games events
1998
Asian Games
1998 Asian Games
1998 in snooker